"Twisting Words" is a song by Australian singer-songwriter  Miiesha, released independently on 27 February 2020 as the third single from her debut studio album, Nyaaringu (2020).

According to Young, the song discusses themes of words being twisted to mean something different. She describes the song as her favourite to perform live.

"Twisting Words" received multiple accolades, for Indigenous Song of the Year, Remote Song of the Year and Soul / Funk / R&B Song of the Year at the 2021 Queensland Music Awards, and a nomination for Most Performed R&B / Soul Work at the 2021 APRA Awards.

Background and release
In an interview with Music Feeds discussing her album, Miiesha described the song as her "favourite song to perform live", saying: "This song is about the way words and the truth can be twisted to mean something different, and how we choose to react to that, do we stand up for the truth or do we stay quiet."

"Twisting Words" was released on 27 February 2020.

Music video
The music video was released alongside the single on 27 February 2020. It was produced and directed by Clare Chapman.

Awards and nominations

APRA Awards

! 
|-
! scope="row"| 2021
| "Twisting Words"
| Most Performed R&B / Soul Work
| 
| 
|}

Queensland Music Awards

! 
|-
! scope="row" rowspan="3"| 2021
| rowspan="3"| "Twisting Words"
| Indigenous Song of the Year
| rowspan="3" 
| rowspan="3"| 
|-
| Remote Song of the Year
|-
| Soul / Funk / R&B Song of the Year
|}

References

 

2020 singles
2020 songs
Mieesha songs
Songs written by Miiesha